Nikita Igorevich Kakkoyev (born 22 August 1999) is a Russian football player. He plays for Pari NN. His primary position is centre-back.

Club career
He made his debut in the Russian Football National League for FC Zenit-2 Saint Petersburg on 8 March 2017 in a game against FC Neftekhimik Nizhnekamsk.

He made his Russian Premier League debut for FC Zenit Saint Petersburg on 1 April 2018 in a game against FC Ufa as an 81st-minute substitute for Yuri Zhirkov.

On 21 February 2019, he signed with FC Tom Tomsk.

Career statistics

References

External links
 
 
 Profile by Russian Football National League

1999 births
Sportspeople from the Republic of Karelia
Living people
Russian footballers
Association football midfielders
Association football defenders
Russia youth international footballers
FC Zenit-2 Saint Petersburg players
FC Zenit Saint Petersburg players
FC Tom Tomsk players
FC Nizhny Novgorod (2015) players
Russian Premier League players
Russian First League players